The fifth competition weekend of the 2008–09 ISU Speed Skating World Cup was a two-day event focusing on the shorter distances, held at the M-Wave arena in Nagano, Japan, from Saturday, 13 December, until Sunday, 14 December 2008. It was the second and last World Cup in Asia of this season.

Schedule of events
The schedule of the event is stands below.

Medal winners

Men's events

Women's events

References

5
Isu World Cup, 2008-09, 5
Sports competitions in Nagano (city)
ISU Speed Skating World Cup – World Cup 5
ISU Speed Skating World Cup – World Cup 5